Al Samriya is a village in Qatar located in the municipality of Al-Shahaniya. It is considered to be a locality of the nearby city of Al-Shahaniya, which is the municipal seat. The Sheikh Faisal Bin Qassim Al Thani Museum is a notable attraction in the village. West of the village is the Al-Shahaniya Camel Racetrack.

Etymology
Al Samriya derives its name from the Samr tree (Latin name Acacia tortilis), which commonly grows in rawdas (depressions) throughout central Qatar.

Al Samriya Farm
A commercial 85-hectare farm is found here. In 1998, 20 hectares were used to grow crops such as cucumber, green beans and sweet peppers in eight greenhouses.

References

Populated places in Al-Shahaniya